August Hjelt  (29 June 1862 in Tuusula – 12 July 1919 in Helsinki) was a Finnish politician. He was a member of the Senate of Finland. He belonged to the conservative Finnish Party. He was a member of the Diet of Finland in 1897 and from 1905 to 1906 and of the Parliament of Finland from 1907 to 1908 and again from 1910 to 1911. He was the younger brother of Edvard Hjelt.

References

External links 
 

1862 births
1919 deaths
People from Tuusula
People from Uusimaa Province (Grand Duchy of Finland)
Finnish Party politicians
Finnish senators
Members of the Diet of Finland
Members of the Parliament of Finland (1907–08)
Members of the Parliament of Finland (1908–09)
Members of the Parliament of Finland (1910–11)
University of Helsinki alumni